Manuel Pedro Cunha da Silva Pereira (15 August 1962), better known as Pedro Silva Pereira, is a Portuguese politician, lawyer and legal expert. He has been a Member of the European Parliament since 2014.

Early life and education
Silva Pereira holds a master's degree in Law from the University of Lisbon.

Political career

Career in national politics
Silva Pereira has been a member of the Socialist Party since 2000. In his home country, he was member of the Portuguese Parliament from 2002 to 2014, Secretary of State of Spatial Planning and Nature Conservation from 1999 to 2002 in António Guterres' second cabinet, and Minister of the Presidency from 2005 to 2011 in José Sócrates' cabinets.

Member of the European Parliament, 2014–present
Silva Pereira first became a Member of the European Parliament in the 2014 elections. He has since been serving on the Committee on Constitutional Affairs. In 2016, he also joined the Committee on Economic and Monetary Affairs. Between 2014 and 2016, he was briefly a member of the Committee on Development. Since 2021, he has been part of the Parliament's delegation to the Conference on the Future of Europe.

Since the 2019 elections, Silva Pereira has been serving as one of the Parliament's Vice-Presidents; in this capacity, he is part of the Parliament's leadership under President David Sassoli.

In addition to his committee assignments, Silva Pereira has been part of the Parliament's delegation for relations with Japan since 2014.

Political positions
Together with Danuta Hübner, Silva Pereira drafted a 2018 report in which they called on the European Parliament to hold 46 of the 73 seats which will be lost after Brexit in reserve for possible new class of MEPs representing pan-European constitutencies and for countries that might join the EU in the future; their proposal was later rejected by a parliamentary majority.

Recognition
Pereira's work on the EU-Japan Economic Partnership Agreement earned him the Order of the Rising Sun, the country's highest honor, in 2019.

References

External links 
  
 

Living people
Members of the Assembly of the Republic (Portugal)
Government ministers of Portugal
MEPs for Portugal 2014–2019
MEPs for Portugal 2019–2024
Socialist Party (Portugal) MEPs
Year of birth missing (living people)